The Križančevo selo massacre occurred in Križančevo selo, a hamlet in the Lašva Valley in central Bosnia, where at least 14 Croat POWs and civilians were killed during an attack by the Army of the Republic of Bosnia and Herzegovina (ARBiH) on Croatian Defence Council (HVO) positions on 22 December 1993.

Attack on Križančevo selo
Throughout 1993, the region of central Bosnia was embroiled in the Croat–Bosniak war. In December 1993, ahead of the Christmas—New Year truce between the HVO and the ARBiH, the ARBiH launched several coordinated attacks against the HVO in the Vitez area. On 22 December, the ARBiH 325th Mountain Brigade captured the HVO-held Križančevo selo, a village situated near the town of Vitez, and the nearby hamlets of Šafradin and Dubravice. After the capture of the village, at least 12 HVO POWs and 2 captured Croat civilians were killed. Other sources mention several dozen killed, with some sources putting the number as high as a hundred.

Aftermath and indictment
The attack was given official recognition from both relevant sides in the conflict in 2010, when the Croatian president Ivo Josipović, Bosnian Roman Catholic Cardinal Archbishop Vinko Puljić, and Bosniak imam Mustafa Cerić made a joint visit at the sites of the Ahmići massacre and the Križančevo selo massacre, and paid respect to the victims.

On 15 February 2019, the Court of Bosnia and Herzegovina indicted the commanders of the 325th Mountain Brigade for a "pre-planned and prepared attack on the HVO soldiers and Croat civilians in the villages of Križančevo selo, Šafradin and Dubravice". According to the indictment, at least 12 HVO POWs and two Croat women that did not take part in combat were killed. The trial in the case began in April 2019.

References

Massacres in the Bosnian War
1993 in Bosnia and Herzegovina
Bosniak war crimes in the Bosnian War
Massacres in 1993
December 1993 events in Europe
Conflicts in 1993
Massacres of Croats